Dolichognatha nietneri, is a species of spider of the genus Dolichognatha. It is endemic to Sri Lanka. The name is after the collector John Nietner.

See also
 List of Tetragnathidae species

References

Tetragnathidae
Endemic fauna of Sri Lanka
Spiders of Asia
Spiders described in 1869